Osenga is a surname.  Notable people with the surname include:

 Andrew Osenga (born 1979), American singer/songwriter and progressive rock musician
 Giuseppina Osenga, nineteenth-century Italian painter, mainly of vedute and landscapes